The 2023 AFL Women's draft consists of the various periods when the 18 clubs in the AFL Women's competition can recruit players prior to the competition's 2023 season.

On October 19, 2022, the AFL announced that this draft will be a once-off overage national draft, to be held on Tuesday, 4 April, 2023 This is a stop-gap measure due to the shortened seasons between season seven and the upcoming 2023 season, and there being no underage competition between the last draft in June 2022 and this one. Only players aged over 19 will be eligible to be drafted.

Priority signing period 
Following the expectation of a stagnant draft, the AFL announced the introduction of a new priority signing period (PSP) in which the four expansion clubs Essendon, Hawthorn, Port Adelaide, and Sydney will be able to poach players who have played three or more AFLW seasons. Port Adelaide were also able to sign one underaged player.

Signing and trading period

Retirements and delistings

Rookie signings 
In the absence of a rookie draft, each club was permitted to sign players that had not played Australian rules football within the previous three years or been involved in an AFLW high-performance program.

Trades

Inactive players

Draft

See also 
 2023 AFL draft

References

AFL Women's draft